Mithlesh Tiwari is an Indian politician. He was elected to the Bihar Legislative Assembly from Baikunthpur constituency of Bihar in the 2015 Bihar Legislative Assembly election as a member of the Bharatiya Janata Party.

References

Living people
Bharatiya Janata Party politicians from Bihar
People from Gopalganj district, India
Bihar MLAs 2015–2020
Year of birth missing (living people)